A list of the most notable films produced in the Cinema of Spain, ordered by decade and year of release on separate pages. For an alphabetical list of articles on Spanish films, see :Category:Spanish films.

List of films by decade
 Spanish films: 1897 - 1929
 Spanish films of the 1930s
 Spanish films of the 1940s
 Spanish films of the 1950s
 Spanish films of the 1960s
 Spanish films of the 1970s
 Spanish films of the 1980s
 Spanish films of the 1990s
 Spanish films of the 2000s
 Spanish films of the 2010s
 Spanish films of the 2020s

See also
List of years in Spain
List of years in Spanish television

External links
 Spanish film at the Internet Movie Database